Marjolein Buis and Yui Kamiji defeated the defending champion Aniek van Koot and her partner Diede de Groot in the final, 6–0, 6–4 to win the women's doubles wheelchair tennis title at the 2018 Australian Open.

Jiske Griffioen and van Koot were the reigning champions, but Griffioen did not participate.

Seeds

Draw

Draw

External links
 Main Draw

Wheelchair Women's Doubles
2018 Women's Doubles
2018 in women's tennis
2018 in Australian women's sport